RISC OS Open Ltd. (also referred to as ROOL) is a limited company engaged in computer software and IT consulting. It is managing the process of publishing the source code to RISC OS. Company founders include staff who formerly worked for Pace, the company which acquired RISC OS after Acorn's demise.

The source code publication was initially facilitated by a shared source initiative (SSI) between ROOL and Castle Technology (CTL), prior to a switch to the more widely recognised Apache licence in October 2018.
ROOL hopes that by making the RISC OS source code available for free it will help stimulate development of both the RISC OS source code and the platform as a whole.

Operations 

ROOL set initial goals to make the source code easily available (on the web), and also to establish a wiki, forum and bug tracker. These have been available since December 2006.

Operations exist to facilitate tasks related to ROOL's goals. Additionally, staff undertake development work on the code themselves. Since early 2009, ownership, development and sales of the  tools were transferred to RISC OS Open. As an extension to the initial goals, in 2011 ROOL introduced a bounty scheme to encourage further development.

Attendance at  computer shows is often arranged, with other knowledgeable coders sometimes standing in when ROOL staff are unavailable. A Facebook page was created in 2012.

Publishing 
A number of book titles have been published starting in 2015 with the RISC OS Style Guide, a three book set in support of the Desktop Development Environment, BBC BASIC Reference Manual and the RISC OS 5 User Guide.

Forum 
Discussions of a technical and more general nature take place on the forum. A thread entitled "Let's get started with a Pandora port" witnessed discussion of porting to the Cortex-A8 used in the Pandora handheld game console. The thread was started in September 2008.

References 

RISC OS
Software companies of the United Kingdom
Companies based in West Sussex
Companies established in 2006
Development software companies
2006 establishments in the United Kingdom
Software companies established in 2006